Joseph David Keery (born April 24, 1992) is an American actor and musician. He is best known for playing Steve Harrington in the science fiction series Stranger Things (2016–present) and for his role in the comedy film Free Guy (2021). Keery releases music under the stage name Djo. He is a former member of the psychedelic rock band Post Animal.

Early life 
Keery was born in Newburyport, Massachusetts. His father is an architect and his mother is an English professor. He is the second of five children.

Keery was raised in Newburyport and attended River Valley Charter School, a local Montessori elementary and middle school, and Newburyport High School. When he was young, he participated in Theater in the Open, a performing arts camp at Maudslay State Park, but ultimately began acting in high school, initially performing there at his older sister's insistence.

Keery went on to study at The Theatre School at DePaul University and graduated in 2014 with a Bachelor of Fine Arts in Acting.

Career

Acting 
After graduating from DePaul, Keery went to over a hundred auditions. Before his breakout role in Stranger Things, Keery appeared in a KFC, Domino's, and amiibo commercial, and had roles in Empire and Chicago Fire. His first appearance in a full-length film was in Stephen Cone's indie, Henry Gamble's Birthday Party.

Keery's breakthrough role was as Steve in the Netflix sci-fi series Stranger Things. He was cast in late 2015; having initially auditioned for the role of Jonathan, he later sent in a tape for his character, Steve. The show premiered in 2016 to critical acclaim. He was promoted from recurring cast to a series regular for the second season of Stranger Things. The third and fourth seasons were released in 2019 and 2022, respectively.

Since beginning Stranger Things, Keery has also acted in a few independent movies, including starring in the 2020 satire film, Spree. He also played the role of Walter "Keys" McKey, a game developer, in the 2021 action comedy film, Free Guy, which went on to become a major box-office hit. In May 2022, he was cast opposite Liam Neeson in the sci-fi action film Cold Storage. In August 2022, he was cast as Gator Tillman in the fifth season of Fargo.

Music 
Aside from acting, Keery is also a musician. In his early twenties, he released music under the name "Cool Cool Cool." Keery was a guitarist and drummer for Chicago-based garage and psych-rock band Post Animal. Their debut album was released in October 2015. The band's second album, When I Think Of You In A Castle, was released in April 2018 and saw Keery performing guitar and vocals. As of 2019, Keery was no longer a touring member of the band, and he later parted ways due to acting commitments.

On July 19, 2019, Keery self-released the single "Roddy" as a solo artist under the moniker Djo. Keery released a second single on August 9, 2019, titled "Chateau (Feel Alright)" under the same moniker. On September 13, 2019, Keery released his debut album as Djo, Twenty Twenty. In a positive review of the album, NME called Keery "a musician of very high calibre who... dabbles in the kind of inventive, warped psychedelia that gently twists your melon and constantly shapeshifts around you," and compared his music to that of Tame Impala and Ariel Pink.

On September 9, 2020, he released a new single, "Keep Your Head Up". In 2022, he took part in a summer music festival tour. His sophomore album Decide was announced in June 2022, along with the release of its first single "Change". The album was released on September 16, 2022, and received positive reviews.

Personal life 
Keery has criticized the online obsession over his hair, calling it "really ridiculous". He is a fan of Charli XCX and Stanley Tucci. In a 2021 interview with GQ, he said he feared an environmental apocalypse, "especially after the fires last year and the storms that are destroying the central south of our country".

He has been in a relationship with Maika Monroe since 2017.

Filmography

Film

Television

Discography

As Djo 
Studio albums
 Twenty Twenty (September 13, 2019)
 Decide (September 16, 2022)

Singles
 "Roddy" (July 19, 2019)
 "Chateau (Feel Alright)" (August 9, 2019)
 "Mortal Projections" (August 30, 2019)
 "Keep Your Head Up" (September 9, 2020)
 "Change" (June 22, 2022)
 "Gloom" (July 25, 2022)
 "Figure You Out" (August 26, 2022)
 "Half Life" (September 9, 2022)

With Post Animal 
Studio albums
 When I Think of You in a Castle (April 20, 2018)

Extended plays
 Post Animal Perform the Most Curious Water Activities (December 3, 2015)
 The Garden Series (July 22, 2016)

Awards and nominations

References

External links 
 

1992 births
Living people
American male film actors
American male television actors
People from Newburyport, Massachusetts
Male actors from Massachusetts
21st-century American male actors
DePaul University alumni